Ocean City Transportation is a public transit agency serving the beach town of Ocean City in Worcester County, Maryland in the United States. The agency is a division of the town's Public Works Department. Ocean City Transportation offers bus service branded as Beach Bus, trackless train service along the Ocean City Boardwalk known as the Boardwalk Tram, and paratransit service called ADA Para Transit.

Services

Beach Bus

Ocean City Transportation operates two regular bus routes serving Ocean City, the Coastal Highway Beach Bus and the West Ocean City Park-N-Ride Beach Bus, along with the Express Beach Bus for special events. The Coastal Highway Beach Bus runs the entire length of the city 24 hours a day, 7 days a week on a year-round basis. The bus begins at the South Division Street Transit Center near the Ocean City Inlet and follows Baltimore Avenue northbound and Philadelphia Avenue southbound through downtown Ocean City to 15th Street. From here, the Beach Bus follows Philadelphia Avenue north to 33rd Street and continues north along Coastal Highway to 145th Street near the Delaware border, reaching its northern terminus at the 144th Street Transit Center. During the summer season, the city hires additional operators for the highest periods of ridership. These seasonal bus drivers are frequently retirees from other transit authorities as well as school bus drivers across the state of Maryland who are off during the summer season while schools are not in session.

The West Ocean City Park-N-Ride Beach Bus provides a park and ride service into Ocean City from the West Ocean City Park and Ride. Patrons can park their cars at the Park and Ride's lot in West Ocean City off U.S. Route 50 and take the bus into the city to connect with the Coastal Highway Beach Bus at the South Division Street Transit Center. This service also serves the Outlets Ocean City in West Ocean City. The West Ocean City Park-N-Ride Beach Bus operates in May for the Springfest and OC Cruisin' weekends, daily between Memorial Day weekend and Labor Day weekend, and in September for the Bikefest and Sunfest weekends. Service runs from 6 a.m. to 2 a.m, with service ending at 10 p.m. on the Sunday of the Springfest OC Cruisin', Bikefest, and Sunfest weekends.

The Express Beach Bus provides service for special events during the summer, providing service to events from remote parking areas. During the Springfest weekend in May, service is provided from Roland E. Powell Convention Center parking lot to the Springfest Fair grounds. For the OC Airshow in June, buses operate from the West Ocean City Park and Ride to 17th Street and Baltimore Avenue. During the White Marlin Open in August, service is provided from Roland E. Powell Convention Center parking lot to Jacqueline Avenue and 14th Street. For the Sunfest weekend in September, buses operate from the Roland E. Powell Convention Center to the Sunfest Fair grounds.

Ocean City Transportation buses offer connections to Shore Transit buses to lower Eastern Shore points at the West Ocean City Park and Ride in the summer and the South Division Street Transit Center in the offseason. Between May and September, DART First State's Beach Bus Route 208 bus connects the Coastal Highway Beach Bus at the 144th Street Transit Center with the Delaware Beaches.

Boardwalk Tram
Ocean City Transportation maintains a fleet of open-air trackless train shuttles which run along the Boardwalk called the Boardwalk Tram. The trams run the entire length of the boardwalk from S. Division Street to 27th Street. South of 5th Street, the tram has a separate concrete path it runs on parallel to the boardwalk. The tram path takes a detour close to the ocean at the pier. North of 5th Street, a marked lane down the middle of the boardwalk warns pedestrians of the shuttle.  Passengers board and alight at any point along the route by notifying the driver. The Boardwalk Tram operates during Springfest weekend in May, daily between Memorial Day weekend and the weekend after Labor Day, and on weekends through Sunfest weekend in September.

From the early 1990s up until 2002, the tram cars were pulled exclusively by Jeep Wrangler (YJ) Islander Editions that were specially modified to pull the tram cars. In 2002, the Jeeps were replaced by Tram Industries Model 6000s. One of the Model 6000 cars caught fire in 2013, and was replaced by a Jeep Wrangler. In 2018, the Town voted to replace all Tram Industries Model 6000s with new Jeep Wranglers.

ADA Para Transit
Ocean City Transportation offers paratransit service called ADA Para Transit, which provides door-to-door service for disabled residents and visitors. Paratransit service is available during the same hours the Coastal Highway Beach Bus operates through advance reservations. MEDTRN service is offered on Monday, Wednesday, and Friday to Ocean City residents to provide round-trip service to and from medical appointments in Salisbury, Pocomoke City, Cambridge, Baltimore, and Philadelphia by way of Shore Transit.

Fares
Ocean City Transportation offers an all-day fare for $3 that can be used on the Coastal Highway Beach Bus, the West Ocean City Park-N-Ride Beach Bus, the Express Beach Bus, and ADA Para Transit. Fares may be paid in cash or with EMONEY. A reduced all-day fare of $1.50 is available for senior citizens over age 65, disabled people, holders of Medicare cards, and persons holding an Ocean City Non-Resident Senior Bus Pass. The Ocean City Non-Resident Senior Bus Pass is available for free while the Ocean City Resident Senior Bus Pass costs $7.00 and is good for 2 years. Fares for the Boardwalk Tram cost $3 for a one-way ride, which may be paid with cash or major credit cards. A discount punch card for 8 rides is available for $20. An unlimited ride pass for $6 is valid between the hours of 11 a.m. and 4 p.m., excluding holidays, holiday weekends, and special events. Tram fares can be purchased at ticket booths located at both ends of the boardwalk and on board the tram from the conductor. ADA Para Transit's MEDTRN service costs $5 each way.

Fleet
The Ocean City Transportation bus fleet consists mainly of ElDorado National buses, as well as a handful of New Flyer buses. They also formerly operated Thomas Built Buses CL960 model and the TL960 model, both in  lengths, Blue Bird Xcel 102s in a  length, and ElDorado National XHF buses in a  length. In past years, Ocean City received somewhere about 10-17 articulated buses that were retired by MTA Maryland, which were built by North American Bus Industries in 1995-96. The buses were frequently borrowed every summer to maintain the increase in ridership and crowding of their current 40-foot vehicles.

Retired fleet

References

External links

Official website

Bus transportation in Maryland
Transportation in Worcester County, Maryland
Ocean City, Maryland
West Ocean City, Maryland